Willy Chirino (born April 5, 1947, in Consolación del Sur, Pinar del Río, Cuba) is a Cuban-American musician.

Early life
Following the communist revolution in Cuba, Chirino came to the United States in 1960 as part of Operation Peter Pan, designed to save children who were being abducted by the new communist regime. This U.S. government-sponsored program, in conjunction with the Catholic Welfare Bureau, provided refuge to approximately 14,000 Cuban children who were cared for in U.S. foster homes until their parents could flee Cuba and arrive in the U.S. Chirino later recorded a song, "Nuestro Día Ya Viene Llegando" ("Our Day is Coming"), loosely based on his experiences as a refugee from communism. The song has become something of an anthem for Cuban exiles everywhere.

Career
Chirino began his artistic career in Miami, releasing his first album in 1974. Since then, he has recorded over 20 albums, several of which have attained platinum and gold status. In 2006, his album "Son del Alma", won a Grammy for Best Salsa/Merengue Album. As founder of the Willy Chirino Foundation, his philanthropic efforts have been recognized by UNICEF and the Department of State. He celebrated his 35th anniversary in music with his latest released album "Willy Chirino Live-35th Anniversary" ("Willy Chirino En Vivo-35 Aniversario"), a CD/DVD combo of the concert. This album brought him his first nomination for Best Salsa Album at the 2007 Latin Grammy Awards. Most recently, Chirino and his wife, singer-songwriter Lissette Álvarez, released their first album together, Amarraditos (Bound to One Another). The CD includes a potpourri of classic Spanish-language love songs. Chirino's album, "Pa'lante", was released at spring 2008, after which he launched a world tour. In 2011, when asked of how his recordings of My Beatles Heart, he said that Sony scrutinized every single one of his songs and their versions because they consider the songs by The Beatles as one of their most precious treasures, and wanted to make sure they were being used in a rightful manner.

In 2014, Chirino received a Latin Grammy Lifetime Achievement Award in Las Vegas for his music career.

Personal life
His first marriage to Olga Maria Rodriguez and bore three daughters: Angie, Olga Maria and Jessica. He later married Lissette Álvarez and had three more children: Nicolle, Alana, and Gianfranco. He has three grandchildren, Elis Regina, Andres and Dashiel. He and his wife support the Cuban dissident movement, Yo No Coopero Con La Dictadura (I Don't Cooperate with the Dictatorship).

Discography

 1974: One Man Alone
 1975: Chirino
 1976: Chirino 3
 1977: ¿Quién Salvó la Ciudad?
 1978: Evolución
 1979: Come into My Music
 1980: Diferente
 1981: La Salsa y Yo
 1982: Chirinísimo
 1983: Subiendo
 1985: 14 Éxitos
 1985: Zarabanda
 1988: Amándote
 1989: Lo que Está Pa' Ti
 1990: Acuarela del Caribe
 1991: Oxígeno
 1992: Un Tipo Típico y Sus Éxitos
 1992: Mis Primeros Éxitos
 1993: South Beach
 1994: Oro Salsero: 20 Éxitos
 1994: Brillantes
 1995: Asere
 1996: Antología Tropical
 1997: Baila Conmigo
 1997: Oro Salsero: 10 Éxitos Vol. 1
 1998: Oro Salsero: 10 Éxitos Vol. 2
 1998: Cuba Libre
 1999: 20th Anniversary
 2000: Greatest Hits
 2000: Soy
 2001: Afro-Disiac
 2002: 15 Éxitos
 2003: Serie Azul Tropical
 2004: Son del Alma
 2005: Cubanísimo
 2005: 20 Éxitos Originales
 2006: En Vivo: 35° Aniversario
 2007: Amarraditos
 2007: Lo Esencial
 2007: Tesoros de Colección
 2008: Pa' Lante
 2008: Grandes Éxitos en Vivo
 2011: My Beatles Heart
 2011: Mis Favoritas
 2012: Llegó la Navidad
 2013: Soy... I Am: Mis Canciones – My Songs
 2014: Serie Platino
 2018: Navidad en Familia

References

External links
Willy Chirino at Twitter

1947 births
Living people
People from Consolación del Sur
Salsa musicians
Cuban male singers
American entertainers of Cuban descent
Cuban emigrants to the United States
Exiles of the Cuban Revolution in the United States
Grammy Award winners
Latin Grammy Lifetime Achievement Award winners
Latin music record producers
Latin music songwriters